The Province of Alessandria (in Piedmontese of Alessandria: Provinsa ëd Lissändria) is an Italian province, with a population of some 425,000, which forms the southeastern part of the region of Piedmont. The provincial capital is the city of Alessandria.

With an area of  it is the third largest province of Piedmont after the province of Cuneo and the Metropolitan City of Turin. To the north it borders on the province of Vercelli and to the west on the Metropolitan City of Turin and the province of Asti. It shares its southern border with Liguria (province of Savona and the Metropolitan City of Genoa). Its south-east corner touches the Province of Piacenza in Emilia Romagna, while to the east it borders on the Lombard Province of Pavia.

History
The province was created by the Royal Decree n. 3702 of 23 October 1859, the Legge Rattazzi, as a union of five of the six provinces which had formed the Division of Alessandria (the provinces of Alessandria, Acqui, Asti, Casale and Tortona) plus the Province of Novi which had formed part of the Division of Genoa. In 1935 the area of Asti was established as the separate Province of Asti.

Municipalities
There are 190 municipalities (comuni, singular: comune) in the province the largest by population are:

Main sights

The Sacred Mountain of Crea (Italian: Sacro Monte di Crea) is a Roman Catholic Devotional Complex in the comune of Serralunga di Crea (Montferrat), near Alessandria. It is one of the nine Sacri Monti of Piedmont and Lombardy, included in UNESCO World Heritage list. Its construction began in 1589, around a former Sanctuary of St. Mary whose creation is traditionally attributed to Saint Eusebius of Vercelli around 350 AD.

See also
Piemonte (wine)

References

External links

Official website
Official web site for European Sacred Mounts
 MonferratoArte  A historical and bibliographical directory of artists active in the extra-urban Churches of the Diocese of Casale Monferrato. 
Laws and Statutes of the Carpeneto commune, 15th century, Center for Digital Initiatives, University of Vermont Libraries

 
Alessandria